Stoutsville can refer to:

Stoutsville, Missouri
Stoutsville, Ohio